Lucien Adam (1833–1918) was a French linguist.

Life

Lucien Adam was born in Nancy, France. 
He became known for his writings on eastern Ural–Altaic dialects, and for writings on the Cree and Ojibwe dialects of the Algonquin language family. 
The International Congress of Americanists was organized in 1875.
Due to lack of interest in the United States, it held its first meeting in Nancy in July 1875. 
Lucien Adam was Secretary at this meeting, and read a paper on "Fusang, of the Chinese Discovery of America." 

Adam was one of the first to give the "substratist" theory of the origins of creole languages in general terms.
In French Guiana and Trinidad he found that French words were added to a West African system of pronunciation and grammar, while in Mauritius they were added to a Malagasy language sub-stratum.

In the 1882 a book was published by a French Seminary student, Jean Parisot, that claimed to be the grammar and other material of the hitherto undocumented Taensa language spoken by a people of Louisiana.
The Grammaire et vocabulaire de la langue Taensa, avec textes traduits et commentés par J.-D. Haumonté, Parisot, L. Adam was published in 1882 in Paris and caused a stir among linguists. 
When the material was published, Adam provided commentary and Julien Vinson gave his support.
Later, expert in American linguistics became increasingly convinced that the work was a hoax, but Adam was slow to withdraw his support.

In 1886, Adam was elected as a member to the American Philosophical Society.

Work

Adam published many books and other works over a long and distinguished career.  A sample:

References
Citations

Sources

1833 births
1918 deaths
Writers from Nancy, France
Linguists from France
Members of the American Philosophical Society